Kolby Kendrall Smith (born December 15, 1984) is a former American football running back and coach who is an offensive assistant for the Miami Dolphins of the National Football League (NFL). He was drafted by the Kansas City Chiefs in the fifth round of the 2007 NFL Draft after he played college football at Louisville. Smith also was a member of the Denver Broncos and Jacksonville Jaguars. After his playing career he began coaching in the college ranks and as 2020 he returned to the NFL as a coach with the Miami Dolphins.

Early years
Smith attended James S. Rickards High School in Tallahassee, Florida, where he was a two-sport star, excelling in football and track. As a junior, he finished ninth at the Florida state track meet in the 110 metre hurdles. On the football field, Smith earned team MVP, first-team All-District and Honorable Mention All-State honors during his junior and senior campaigns. After starting at fullback as a sophomore, blocking for All-American running back Michael Fisher who ran for more than 2,000 yards and 30 scores, Smith played on both sides of the ball as a junior, notching 105 tackles, four sacks and two forced fumbles while also rushing for 947 yards and 10 touchdowns on 88 carries. In his senior year, he tallied over 1,300 yards and 11 touchdowns, earning first-team All-Big Bend Area honors.

Considered a three-star recruit by Rivals.com, Smith was listed as the No. 66 prospect from Florida in the class of 2003. He chose Louisville over Indiana.

College career
In his true freshman season at Louisville, Smith appeared in 12 games and rushed 18 times for 131 yards and one touchdown. Splitting carries with junior Lionel Gates and sophomore Eric Shelton, Smith averaged a team-best 7.3 yards a carry. His first career touchdown came in the regular-season finale against Cincinnati.

As a sophomore, Smith appeared in 10 games and rushed 37 times for 347 yards and four touchdowns, averaging 9.4 yards per rush. His best game of the season again came versus Cincinnati, as he scored a career-high three touchdowns.

Although Gates and Shelton had left for the 2005 NFL Draft, Smith spent the 2005 season as backup to Michael Bush. While Bush led the NCAA in scoring, Smith ranked third on the team in rushing with 523 yards and six touchdowns, averaging 4.9 yards per carry.

Expected to play a backup role again in 2006, Smith became the starting tailback after Bush suffered a season-ending injury to his tibia. Smith rushed for 697 yards on 126 carries, averaging 5.5 yards per carry, and scoring five touchdowns. In his best game of the season, he scored two touchdowns, rushing for 165 yards on 16 carries, versus Syracuse.

Professional career

2007 NFL Draft
At the 2006 Senior Bowl, Smith was not able to impress scouts, instead "looking like an ordinary ball carrier". He was selected in the fifth round (148th overall) in the 2007 NFL Draft by the Kansas City Chiefs. He was signed to a three-year contract on June 22, 2007.

Kansas City Chiefs
His first career NFL start was on November 25, 2007 due to injuries to Larry Johnson and the retirement of Priest Holmes. He recorded his first career touchdown on that date against the Oakland Raiders at Arrowhead Stadium in Kansas City.

On December 5, 2009, he was placed on Injured Reserve due to an ankle injury.

He was re-signed by the Chiefs on February 24, 2010.

Kansas City Chiefs waived Smith on June 14, 2010.

Denver Broncos
The Denver Broncos were assigned Smith off waivers on June 15, 2010. He was waived on August 4.

Jacksonville Jaguars
Smith was signed by the Jacksonville Jaguars on August 25, 2010. He was waived on September 3.

Coaching career

College Coaching 
In 2012, Smith began his coaching career as the graduate assistant at Arkansas. In 2013, he joined the Western Kentucky football program as tailbacks coach. WKU's head coach Bobby Petrino was the head coach of Louisville when Smith played for the Cardinals. In January 2014, Smith was brought along to Louisville and became the running back coach for Louisville under new/old Head Coach Bobby Petrino. After Petrino was fired in 2018, Smith spent the 2019 season coaching running backs at Rutgers he however wasn’t retained by the newly hired Greg Schiano for the 2020 season.

NFL coaching 
On June 13, 2020, it was announced that Smith would be an offensive quality control coach for the Miami Dolphins. He missed the team's weeks 9 and 10 games against the Arizona Cardinals and Los Angeles Chargers on November 8 and November 15, 2020, in accordance with COVID-19 protocols.

Personal life
Smith is a cousin of Mike Brown, a strong safety who spent most of his NFL career with the Chicago Bears. He majored in Sports Administration at Louisville.

References

http://www.wkusports.com/sports/m-footbl/mtt/kolby_smith_845204.html

External links
Kansas City Chiefs bio
Louisville Cardinals bio

1984 births
Living people
Players of American football from Tallahassee, Florida
African-American players of American football
American football running backs
Louisville Cardinals football players
Kansas City Chiefs players
Denver Broncos players
Jacksonville Jaguars players
Arkansas Razorbacks football coaches
Western Kentucky Hilltoppers football coaches
Louisville Cardinals football coaches
Rutgers Scarlet Knights football coaches
21st-century African-American sportspeople
20th-century African-American people
Miami Dolphins coaches